Bangladesh made its Paralympic début at the 2004 Summer Paralympics in Athens. The country was represented by a single athlete competing in one sport, and did not win a medal.

Sports

Athletics

Men's track

See also
 Bangladesh at the Paralympics
 Bangladesh at the 2004 Summer Olympics

References

External links 
 

Nations at the 2004 Summer Paralympics
2004
Summer Paralympics